Zhang Limin (born March 1950) is a Chinese ambassador.
From 1985 to 1986 he was director of the General Office of Beijing Personnel Service Corporation for Diplomatic Missions. 
From 1987 to 1992 he was deputy General-Manager of the Beijing International Club Corporation Limited.
From 1992 to 1995 he was General-Manager of the Beijing International Club Corporation Limited.
From 1995 to 2002 he was Director-General of the Beijing Service Bureau for Diplomatic Missions.
From March 2003 to October 2005 he was ambassador in Nikosia (Cyprus).
From November 2005  July 2008 he was ambassador in Riga (Latvia).
On 19 August 2008 he was designated ambassador in Wellington (New Zealand) where he was from August 2008 to August 2010 accredited and coaccredited to Avarua (Cook Islands) and Alofi, Niue (Niue).
From December 2012 to January 2017 he was ambassador in Georgetown (Guyana).
Currently he is a member of the Council for Promoting South–South Cooperation as well as the special consultant to the Research Center for Latin America at  Southwestern University of Finance and Economics.

References

1954 births
Living people
Ambassadors of China to Cyprus
Ambassadors of China to Latvia
Ambassadors of China to New Zealand
Ambassadors of China to Guyana
Ambassadors of China to Niue